La Destrousse is a commune in the department of Bouches-du-Rhône in the Provence-Alpes-Côte d'Azur region in southern France. The commune was created in 1870 from part of Peypin.

Population

See also
Communes of the Bouches-du-Rhône department

References

Communes of Bouches-du-Rhône
Bouches-du-Rhône communes articles needing translation from French Wikipedia